Scatter may refer to:

 Scattering, in physics, the study of collisions
 Statistical dispersion or scatter
 Scatter (modeling), a substance used in the building of dioramas and model railways
 Scatter, in computer programming, a parameter in network broadcasting
 Scatter (band), a Scottish improvisational music collective

See also 
 Scatter plot, a type of diagram
 Scattered (disambiguation)